Hot Shots is an American shooting sport TV series produced by Creative Fuel Media for the NBC Sports Network, which follows well known shooting personalities both on and off the range, including Jerry Miculek, Clint Upchurch, KC Eusebio and Max Michel.

See also 
 Top Shot, an American shooting sport television show debuted on The History Channel
 3-Gun Nation

References 

NBCSN shows
American sports television series 
Shooting sports on television